Giustini is an Italian surname. Notable people with the surname include:

Alessio Giustini (born 1991), Italian footballer
Carlo Giustini (born 1923), Italian actor
Filippo Giustini (1852–1920), Italian cardinal
Lodovico Giustini (1685–1743), Italian Baroque composer

Italian-language surnames